The Faridabad–Noida–Ghaziabad Expressway or FNG Expressway is an under-construction 56 km long, 6-lane wide (expandable to 8) expressway in Delhi NCR region of India. It will connect Faridabad in Haryana with Noida and Ghaziabad in Uttar Pradesh.

Route
The expressway is around 56 km long with 20 km in Noida–Greater Noida region, 8 km in Ghaziabad, while the remaining 28.1km is in the Faridabad region, especially the developing sectors of Neharpar. According to the plan, the expressway from Noida side will become operational in the next 14 months, while it would take three years for the whole stretch to become fully operational.

Detailed route is as follows:

 Ghaziabad district
 From NH34 (near Arya Nagar & Hindan Vihar) to NE3 Delhi–Meerut Expressway (near Rahul Vihar).

 Noida
 From NE3 Delhi–Meerut Expressway (near Rahul Vihar), through Noida's sector 121, 122, 140 and 150, to sector 168 (near Chhaproli Khadar) to intersect with Noida-Greater Noida Expressway and bridge ove Yamuna near Chak Mangroli.

 Faridabad district
 From Chak Mangroli bridge, along DFC corridor, to Shahpur where it connects to Faridabad Bypass Expressway (part of Delhi–Mumbai Expressway project which also connects it to Sohna-Gurugaon Sohna Elevated Corridor).

Design
The completed expressway designed by IIT-Roorkee will offer commuters direct connectivity between Noida and Greater Faridabad A bridge is also planned from Noida's Sector 150 to National Highway 19  in Faridabad as a part of the FNG (Faridabad–Noida–Ghaziabad Expressway).

Inter-connectivity

Following will either connect to or will provide an alternate route to the FNG Expressway:

 Okhla-Noida SEZ Expressway i.e. Aghapur-Bhangel Elevated Road: from Aghapur near southeast corner of Okhla Bird Sanctuary to Bhangel (Noida SEZ).

 Chilla-Okhla Expressway i e. Chilla-Shahadra Drain Elevated Road: from DND Flyway at Chilla, then over and along the Shahdara Drain to Okhla Bird Sanctuary (beginning of Noida-Greater Noida Expressway and Noida-Greater Noida Bundh Expressway).

 Noida-Greater Noida Bundh Expressway: nearly 25 km long, INR 400 crore, 6-lane expressway between Yamuna river and existing Noida-Greater Noida Expressway will run over the bundh (flood prevention embankment) from Noida Sector-94 (southeast corner of Okhla bird sanctuary) to Noida Sector-168. Near sector 94, it will start from the existing Noida-Greater Noida Expressway, then along the way near Gulavali & sector 160 will interchange with Gulavali-LG Chowk road, and end near sector 168 at Faridabad–Noida–Ghaziabad Expressway (FNG).

Status Updates

 Sep 2014: Work is under progress on the Uttar Pradesh part of the upcoming expressway.
 Oct 2015: 70% work on Noida part is completed. Work not started in Faridabad part.
 Dec 2017: Work on the expressway to start in 2018.
 Apr 2018: Work on expressway started in Noida.

See also
 List of highways in Haryana
 Western Peripheral Expressway
 Eastern Peripheral Expressway

References

Roads in Delhi
Expressways in Haryana
Transport in Faridabad
Transport in Noida
Transport in Ghaziabad, Uttar Pradesh
Expressways in Uttar Pradesh
Roads in Haryana